Rosh HaAyin Forest is a forest and green area located in the northeastern part of Rosh HaAyin, Israel, along the tributary of Nahal Rabba.

History 
The forest was planted by the Jewish National Fund between 1976 and 1980 and hosts eucalyptus, pine, cypress, carob, almond, common jujube, woodland and orchard trees. It is near new city neighborhoods. Several forest archaeological sites, including Eben-Ezer, which is identified with the Biblical village of Ebenezer and Khirbet al-Daooir, are located there. Remains of an ancient settlement are there, next to which stood the "Ilan Lookout" overlooking Nahal Rabba, Samaria and Road 5.

KKL-JNF and the city of Rosh HaAyin in 2001 neglected the forest and it was used as an illegal waste dump. Cultivation commenced in 2006 and landscape restoration was carried out. The forest was adopted by two elementary schools using "Afek School of Sustainability". It is defined by JNF as a "community forest".

Access 
The forest has one entrance for vehicles and additional entrances for pedestrians or cyclists. Hiking and biking trails are marked.

The main entrance to vehicles is from Kibbutz Galuyot Street. A circular path passes through a variety of flowers and reaches the observation point at the top of the hill in Khirbet a-Dwyer. Another part of the forest is in the northern part of the Hill Hill neighborhood. In this part is archeological site Izbet Tzarta. The entrance to this section is from the end of Natan Shaul Street and from there ascends the Auxiliary Stone Trail that reaches the summit where the archeological site and explanatory signs are located. Another pedestrian entrance is in the military neighborhood of Neve Afek on Keshet Street.

Flora 
The Rosh HaAyin forest, the path of wildflowers and the fields that surround them, are known for their flowering at the end of winter and spring. Anemones are found in red and white and blue in the forest and surrounding fields, and on the hill of the wildflower trail, cyclamen bloom. In the flowering fields, yellow-rooted spotted flowers thrive. In the spring,  a wide variety of flowers in the forest, including anemones, tulips, bulbs, and bees. are found to be blooming profusely.

Gallery

References 

Forests of Israel